Epirmupi ( E-pir-mu-pil, previously read E-nam-mu-de) was a ruler of Elam around 2199–2154 BCE. His name is purely Akkadian, and he was in charge of Elam at the time of Rimush and Manishtushu, or early in the reign of Naram-Sin and probably their dependent and vassal. His title of "Military Governor" (Shakkanakku in Akkadian, GIR.NITA in Sumerian) suggests that he was a dependent of the Akkadian kings, rather than an independent ruler. He also held the title of Ensi of Susa".

His successor was probably Ili-ishmani. After Ili-ishmani, and the weakening of the Akkadian Empire, rule in Elam reverted to local rulers of the Awan Dynasty.

Seal inscriptions
Various inscriptions in the name of Epirmupi are known, especially "Epirmupi, the Shakkanakku of the land of Elam” and "Epirmupi, Ensi of Susa".

A seal is known with the inscription "Epirmupi, the strong, Liburbeli, cup-bearer, your servant", incorporating the image of two heroic combats: a naked hero versus a lion and a naked hero against a buffalo. The seal is now in the Louvre Museum.

References

Elamite people
Elamite kings
23rd-century BC rulers
Awan Dynasty